New Way may refer to:

Political parties 
New Way (Israel), a short-lived political faction in Israel in 2001
New Way (Turkey), the Turkish section of the reunified Fourth International

Publications 
 New Way (Jewish newspaper), a newspaper of the Russian Empire subtitled 
New Way (Naujas Kelias), a Neo-Nazi Publication in Lithuania
 Novy Put, a magazine of the Russian Empire

Many other Russian publications and topics are entitled .

Towns 
New Way, Ohio, a community in the United States
New Way, Essex, United Kingdom, a hamlet near Harlow

Music 
"New Way (To Light Up an Old Flame)", a single by American country music artist Joe Diffie